Vincent J. Garcia (born July 19, 1967) is a Filipino politician. A member of the Nationalist People's Coalition, he has been elected to three terms as a Member of the House of Representatives of the Philippines, representing the Second District of Davao City. First elected in 2001, he was re-elected in 2004 and 2007.

References

 
 

Ateneo de Manila University alumni
People from Davao City
1967 births
Living people
Nationalist People's Coalition politicians
Members of the House of Representatives of the Philippines from Davao City